Vaughan Coveny (born 13 December 1971) is a retired football player who frequently represented New Zealand in international matches. Coveny's senior club career spanned 20 years, with his most notable stint being at South Melbourne during their National Soccer League era. He was primarily a striker although he also played as a winger. After retiring from playing, he pursued a coaching career.

Club career
Coveny began his NSL career at the Melbourne Knights, then moved to Wollongong City.

South Melbourne FC 
The majority of Coveny's career was spent at South Melbourne in the NSL, and later on, Victorian Premier League. 

Coveny, affectionately known by fans as Horsey due to his speed primarily played as a striker for South Melbourne. Coveny would dominate the NSL with his pace and would capture 2 NSL Championships under Ange Postecoglou in 1997/98 and 1998/99. Additionally, his goalscoring form in the OFC Championship in 1999 fired South to claim the title as Oceania's best and qualify them for the 2000 FIFA Club World Cup. Here, Coveny would put in respectable performances including hitting the post twice against the treble winning Manchester United squad.

Following the disbanding of the back-to back winning squad, Coveny would stay at South and lead the new era in the new century. Coveny would once again reach a grand final for South in 2001 but ultimately lose. 

The disbanding of the NSL was a premature end to Coveny's first stint as South. 

Coveny would return to Lakeside in 2009 helping South to capture the Hellenic cup.  On Anzac Day 2009 Coveny scored his 100th goal for South Melbourne FC away at John Ilhan Memorial Reserve against Hume City FC. He retired at the end of the 2009 season.becoming only the third player to score 100 goals for South. 

Overall, Coveny made 265 appearances for Hellas scoring 104 goals.

Later career 
He also spent some time in the A-League following the collapse of the NSL, playing for the Newcastle Jets and Wellington Phoenix.

International career
Coveny made his full New Zealand debut in a 0–0 draw with Fiji on 19 September 1992. He was included in the New Zealand side for both the 1999 FIFA Confederations Cup finals tournament, and the 2003 FIFA Confederations Cup finals tournament.
He ended his international playing career with 64 A-international caps to his credit, his final cap gained in a 1–1 draw with Estonia on 31 May 2006.

Coveny became New Zealand's highest goal scorer on 27 May 2006, when he scored twice in the "All Whites" 3–1 victory over Georgia, bringing his total A-international goal tally to 29. and his total including unofficial games to 30 in 71 games, surpassing Jock Newall's long standing record of 28 from only 17 games. Coveny record was officially overtaken by Chris Wood on 21 March 2022 when Wood's scored his 30th goal. In January 2009, Coveny announced his retirement from international football. He was also the games record holder for the All Whites, until Ivan Vicelich passed him in 2009. He is currently ranked third in appearances for the All Whites, behind Simon Elliott and Vicelich.

International career statistics

International goals

Managerial career
After retiring, Coveny was announced as South Melbourne's manager for the Victorian Premier League 2010 season. After the team failed to make the finals, his contract was not renewed.

Honours

South Melbourne 

 NSL Championship: 1997/1998, 1998/1999
 NSL Premiership 1997/1998, 2000,2001
 NSL Cup: 1995/1996
 Dockerty Cup: 1995
 OFC Championship: 1999
 Hellenic Cup: 2009

New Zealand Young Player of the Year: 1992

References

External links
 
 Wellington Phoenix profile
 Oz Football profile
 NZF – All White profile
 RSSSF Profile

1971 births
Living people
Association footballers from Wellington City
New Zealand association footballers
Melbourne Knights FC players
South Melbourne FC players
Newcastle Jets FC players
New Zealand international footballers
Wellington Phoenix FC players
A-League Men players
National Soccer League (Australia) players
Wollongong Wolves FC players
Miramar Rangers AFC players
New Zealand association football coaches
South Melbourne FC managers
Association football forwards
Waterside Karori players
1996 OFC Nations Cup players
1998 OFC Nations Cup players
1999 FIFA Confederations Cup players
2003 FIFA Confederations Cup players
2004 OFC Nations Cup players